Gabrielle Olivia Mirville (born March 30, 1989), known professionally as Abra (stylized as ABRA), is an American singer and songwriter. She is currently signed to Polo Grounds Music and RCA Records, and was formerly signed to Awful Records.

Early life and career 
Born in Queens, New York into a family of missionaries, Abra spent her first eight years in London, where her parents built the church they would ultimately work in. Her introduction to singing came from that church, too, where her father was pastor and her mother oversaw praise and worship. After London, her family settled in the quiet suburb of Lilburn outside Atlanta. At 14, Abra began playing guitar. She attended Parkview Highschool and was an active member of the drama department, graduating in 2007. Later in her teens, she began uploading her acoustic covers of rap songs onto YouTube. This led to her being discovered by Awful Records founder and rapper Father, who encouraged her to make original music. She later joined the label in 2014.

Her first EP, BLQ Velvet, was released in 2015. Her second EP, Princess was released by True Panther Sounds on July 15, 2016. It is her first release on a major label. The song "Fruit" off the album Rose was featured in an article on the best R&B songs of 2016 by The Guardian.

Regarding Abra's style of clothing, Vogue commented in 2016 that "deliberate contrasts are part of her artistic identity on the whole: Abra is a member of the mostly male-dominated Awful Records coterie, an outlier crew swiftly taking over Atlanta with a sound that stands apart from ATL's rap oeuvre".

Abra is one of the stars of the 2018 film Assassination Nation and plays Em.

Discography

Studio albums

Extended plays

Singles 

ABRA – Diamonds & Gold (2012)
ABRA – Don't Kill Men (2012)
ABRA – Oh Come, Oh Come, Emmanuel (2014)
ABRA – Sin City (2014)
ABRA – NEEDSUMBODY (2014)
ABRA – CENTERSTAGE 1.17 (2015)
ABRA – Then U Get Some (2015)
ABRA – BFF (2015)
ABRA feat. Father – U Ain't Got To Lie (2015)
ABRA – Bounty (2016)
ABRA – NOVACANE (2017) [for Adult Swim Singles]
ABRA – BACARDI (2017)
ABRA – B.R.A.T (2018)
ABRA & Boys Noize – Unlock It (feat. Playboi Carti) (2021)

Guest appearances 

HYDRABADD feat. ABRA – Sanctuary (2013)
DARKCERBERUSSOUND feat. ABRA – Kookaburra (2013)
Archibald SLIM feat. ABRA – Luv (2015)
Micah Freeman feat. ABRA – Movement (2015)
salute feat. ABRA – Colourblind (2015)
Ethereal feat. ABRA & Father – STYX (2015)
KCSB feat. ABRA – All My Luv (2015)
Tommy Genesis feat. ABRA – Hair Like Water Wavy Like The Sea (2015)
Hiko Momoji feat. Father & ABRA – Late Nights (2016)
Ethereal feat. ABRA & Coodie Breeze – Treat You Right (2016)
Ethereal feat. ABRA – Look At U (2016)
Chris Brann feat. ABRA – Once Before (2016)
Father feat. iLoveMakonnen & ABRA – Why Don't You (2016)
Rich Po Slim feat. ABRA – Make You Mine (2016)
Stickz Greenz feat. ABRA – Just Chill (2017)
LiL iFFy feat. ABRA – Dark Times Indeed (2017)
Charli XCX feat. ABRA – Drugs (2017)
Da$H feat. ABRA – Deja U (2017)
josh pan feat. ABRA – give it to ya (2017)
 Father feat. ABRA – Lotto (2018)
 Gorillaz – Sorcererz (2018)
 Toro y Moi feat. ABRA – Miss Me (2019)
 Solange – Sound of Rain (2019)
 Octavian feat. ABRA – My Head (2019)
 Bad Bunny feat. ABRA – SORRY PAPI (2020)
 Boys Noize feat. ABRA – Affection (2021)

Remixes 
Empress Of – Standard (ABRA Remix) (2015)
Father – Everybody In The Club (ABRA Remix) (2015)

References

External links 
Facebook page

 

Living people
21st-century American women singers
21st-century American singers
African-American women singer-songwriters
African-American record producers
American contemporary R&B singers
American expatriates in the United Kingdom
American indie pop musicians
Record producers from New York (state)
Georgia State University alumni
Musicians from Atlanta
Singers from London
Singers from New York City
American women in electronic music
American women record producers
Synth-pop singers
21st-century African-American women singers
Singer-songwriters from New York (state)
1989 births